Eupithecia seatacama is a moth in the family Geometridae first described by Rindge in 1987. It is found in the regions of Atacama (Copiapó Province) and Valparaiso (San Antonio Province) in Chile. The habitat consists of either the Coquimban Desert or Central Coastal Cordillera Biotic Province.

The length of the forewings is about 9.5 mm for males. The forewings are whitish grey with medium and dark brown scaling. The hindwings are paler than the forewings, with brown scaled basal and median areas. Adults have been recorded on wing in October.

Etymology
The specific name is formed from the Latin prefix se- (meaning apart or aside) and the species name Eupithecia atacama and refers to the similarity of both species in maculation (spots).

References

Moths described in 1987
seatacama
Moths of South America
Endemic fauna of Chile